The 2012 Tercera División play-offs to Segunda División B from Tercera División (Promotion play-offs) were the final playoffs for the promotion from 2011–12 Tercera División to 2012–13 Segunda División B. The first four teams in each group (excluding reserve teams) took part in the play-off.

Format

The eighteen group winners have the opportunity to be promoted directly to Segunda División B. The eighteen group winners were drawn into a two-legged series where the nine winners will promote to Segunda División B. The nine losing clubs will enter the play-off round for the last nine promotion spots.

The eighteen runners-up were drawn against one of the seventeen fourth-placed clubs outside their group and the eighteen third-placed clubs were drawn against one another in a two-legged series. The twenty-seven winners will advance with the nine losing clubs from the champions' series to determine the eighteen teams that will enter the last two-legged series for the last nine promotion spots. In all the playoff series, the lower-ranked club play at home first. Whenever there is a tie in position (e.g. like the group winners in the champions' series or the third-placed teams in the first round), a draw determines the club to play at home first.

Group Winners promotion play-off

Qualified teams 
The draw took place in the RFEF headquarters, in Las Rozas (Madrid), on 14 May 2012, 17:00 CEST.

Matches 

|}
The aggregate winners will be promoted to Segunda División B. The aggregate losers were relegated to the Non-champions promotion play-off Second Round.

First leg

Second leg

Non-champions promotion play-off

First round

Qualified teams
The draw took place in the RFEF headquarters, in Las Rozas (Madrid), on 14 May 2012, 17:00 CEST.

Matches

|}

First leg

Second leg

Second round

Qualified teams
The draw will be held in the RFEF headquarters, in Las Rozas (Madrid), on 28 May 2012.

Matches

|}

First leg

Second leg

Final round

Qualified teams
The draw took place in the RFEF headquarters, in Las Rozas (Madrid), on 11 June 2012.

Matches

|}

First leg

Second leg

See also
2012 Segunda División play-offs
2012 Segunda División B play-offs

References

External links
Futbolme.com

2011-12
play-offs
3